The 1956 World Table Tennis Championships mixed doubles was the 23rd edition of the mixed doubles championship.  

Erwin Klein and Leah Neuberger defeated Ivan Andreadis and Ann Haydon in the final by three sets to two.

Results

See also
List of World Table Tennis Championships medalists

References

-